Aaron Marc Stein (November 15 1906 – August 29, 1985), who used the pen name George Bagby, was an American novelist who specialized in mystery fiction. Bagby's focus was on police investigators, especially the fictional Inspector Schmidt, Chief of Homicide for the New York Police Department. In the Schmidt novels,  mystery-writer Bagby himself appears as "the Watson to Schmidt's Holmes, following him on cases, and acting as biographer."  A number of his novels have been translated into other languages, including German, French, and Spanish.

Biography
Stein was born on November 15, 1906  in New York City.  He attended Princeton University, graduating with a degree in archaeology and also summa cum laude.  His early avant-garde novels came to the attention of Theodore Dreiser and were published, but he did not gain much fame till he moved into writing mysteries.  In addition to Bagby, he also published mystery novels under his own name, and under the pseudonym Hampton Stone.

He held a position as a radio critic for a New York newspaper in the 1930s, and then went to work for Time magazine.  During World War II he worked with the US Army.

Over 100 novels by Stein eventually saw publication, and for his lifetime achievements the Mystery Writers of America named him a Grand Master at the 1979 Edgar Awards.  His final book, The Garbage Collector, was published in 1984.  Stein died of cancer in 1985, at the age of 79, in Lenox Hill Hospital in Manhattan.

Primary works 
In addition to the hero of most of the Bagby novels, Inspector Schmidt, Stein also created a New York City Assistant District Attorney named Jeremiah Gibson for the books published under the Stone pseudonym, and archaeologist detectives Tim Mulligan and Elsie Mae Hunt, as well as engineer Matt Herridge, for the mysteries published under his own name.

Stein's first novel was published in 1930.  His first mystery, Murder at the Piano, was published in 1935.  The first novel written as Stone was titled The Corpse in the Corner Saloon.  It was reviewed in the New York Times in 1948.

Selected list of novels 
The Most Wanted (1983)
My Dead Body (1976)
Two in the Bush (1976)
Killer Boy Was Here
Cop Killer
Dead Storage
A Dirty Way to Die
Dead Drunk
Scared to Death (1952)
Drop Dead
In Cold Blood
Red Is for Killing
Murder on the Nose
Murder at the Piano
Bachelors' Wife
Give the Little Corpse a Great Big Hand
Bird Walking Weather (published in French under the title Purée de Pois, Paris, Librairie des Champs-Élysées, Le Masque , 1952)

References

1906 births
1985 deaths
American mystery writers
20th-century American novelists
20th-century American male writers
Princeton University alumni
Writers from New York City
Time (magazine) people
Edgar Award winners
Radio critics
American male novelists
Novelists from New York (state)